Naomie Melanie Harris  (born 6 September 1976) is a British actress. She started her career when she was a child, appearing in the television series Simon and the Witch in 1987. She portrayed Selena in the zombie film 28 Days Later (2002), the witch Tia Dalma in the second and third Pirates of the Caribbean films, Winnie Mandela in Mandela: Long Walk to Freedom (2013), and Frances Barrison / Shriek in Sony's Spider-Man Universe film Venom: Let There Be Carnage (2021). She portrayed Eve Moneypenny in the James Bond films Skyfall (2012), Spectre (2015), and No Time to Die (2021).

In 2016, she starred in the critically acclaimed film Moonlight, a performance that earned her a number of accolades, including nominations for the Golden Globe, BAFTA, and Academy Award for Best Supporting Actress. Harris was appointed an Officer of the Order of the British Empire (OBE) in the 2017 New Year Honours for services to drama.

Early life
Naomie Harris was born on 6 September 1976 in Islington, London, where she was raised. Her mother, Carmen Harris, sometimes credited as Lisselle Kayla, emigrated from Jamaica to London as a child with her parents. Harris's father, Brian Clarke, a fashion designer, emigrated from Trinidad to the UK, and has British, Grenadian, and Guyanese ancestors. They separated before Harris was born, and she was raised by her mother. Harris grew up in a council flat in Finsbury Park. Her mother later remarried and Harris has two younger half-siblings. Her mother worked as a screenwriter on EastEnders and works as a healer.

She attended St Marylebone School in London. Harris attended the Anna Scher Theatre where she studied acting as a child before attending Woodhouse College as a sixth-form student. She graduated from Pembroke College, Cambridge, in 1998 with a degree in social and political sciences. Harris trained at the Bristol Old Vic Theatre School.

Career
Harris has appeared in television and film since she was nine, including a starring role in the remake of the science fiction series The Tomorrow People. In 2000, she played Susan in The Witch of Edmonton at the Southwark Playhouse. She was in the cast of She Stoops to Conquer (Radio 3), Studio 3, Pebble Mill, May 2000.  In November 2002, she starred in Danny Boyle's postapocalyptic film 28 Days Later. In the same year, she starred in the television adaptation of Zadie Smith's White Teeth. Harris has appeared in Pirates of the Caribbean: Dead Man's Chest, Pirates of the Caribbean: At World's End, and Michael Mann's Miami Vice. She did a comic turn in Michael Winterbottom's indie ensemble piece, A Cock and Bull Story (2005). She starred in Channel 4's adaptation of the 2006 novel Poppy Shakespeare, which was first shown on 31 March 2008. She also appeared in BBC's historical drama Small Island in December 2009.

She played Elizabeth Lavenza in Danny Boyle's stage production of Mary Shelley's Frankenstein for the National Theatre from 22 February to 2 May 2011. She played the lead role in The First Grader, directed by Justin Chadwick, which was premiered on 18 May 2011 in the Seattle International Film Festival.

Harris co-starred in the 23rd James Bond film, Skyfall (2012), playing Miss Moneypenny. She is the first black actress to play Moneypenny, and is the first Moneypenny to be given a first name. Harris reprised her role as Moneypenny in the 24th Bond film, Spectre, which was released on 26 October 2015.

Harris portrayed Winnie Mandela in the biopic Mandela: Long Walk to Freedom, based on the book of the same name, opposite the actor Idris Elba. The film was released on 29 November 2013. On viewing the film, Winnie Madikizela-Mandela told Harris that it seemed as if she were not acting, but channeling her, and that it was "the first time she felt truly captured on film".

In 2016, Harris starred as Paula in the critically acclaimed film Moonlight. She played the abusive, drug-addicted mother of the film's main character, Chiron. The film follows her son and her through a 20-year period. Moonlight won the Academy Award for Best Picture and Harris was nominated for an Academy Award for Best Supporting Actress, Screen Actors Guild Award for Outstanding Performance by a Female Actor in a Supporting Role, and Golden Globe Award for Best Supporting Actress – Motion Picture, among other awards.

In 2021, Harris reprised her role as Eve Moneypenny in the James Bond film
No Time to Die and starred as Frances Barrison / Shriek in Venom: Let There Be Carnage.

Personal life 
At about 11, Harris was diagnosed with scoliosis. The condition progressed severely into her teen years which necessitated a spinal fusion; it took her a month to recover fully and she had to learn how to walk again. As a teenager, Harris also suffered from adenomyosis.

In 2012, Harris began a relationship with Peter Legler.

On the topic of having children, Harris stated in a 2017 interview with Woman magazine:

People ask, 'So when are you going to have children?' I think it's a really odd thing because it's such a personal decision. And also, you don't know what is happening in someone's life. I find it bizarre, even with my friends, when they want me to have children. Why would you encourage anybody to have children unless it was their burning desire? You need to be fully committed to it... Have children when you're ready, if you're ready, but only then. I'd never had any pressure.

Filmography

Films

Television

Video games

Theatre

Awards and nominations

In addition to numerous acting awards, Harris was appointed an Officer of the Order of the British Empire (OBE) in the 2017 New Year Honours, for services to drama. She received the honour from Queen Elizabeth II at Buckingham Palace on 23 February 2017. She has also been recognised for her influence with her addition in the 2019 edition of the Powerlist, ranking the 100 most influential Black Britons.

References

External links

 
 2002 interview with The Guardian Unlimited
 2016 interview with Tavis Smiley (PBS)

1976 births
20th-century English actresses
21st-century English actresses
Actresses from London
Alumni of Bristol Old Vic Theatre School
Alumni of Pembroke College, Cambridge
Audiobook narrators
Black British actresses
English film actresses
English people of Guyanese descent
English people of Jamaican descent
English people of Nigerian descent
English people of Trinidad and Tobago descent
English television actresses
English voice actresses
Living people
People educated at St Marylebone School
English child actresses
Officers of the Order of the British Empire
People from Finsbury Park
People from Harringay
People from Islington (district)
Alumni of the Anna Scher Theatre School
American voice actresses
21st-century American women